The 2020–21 season was the 111th season in the existence of U.S. Sassuolo Calcio and the club's 8th consecutive season in the top flight of Italian football. In addition to the domestic league, Sassuolo participated in this season's edition of the Coppa Italia. The season covered the period from 3 August 2020 to 30 June 2021.

First-team squad

As of 20 September 2020

Transfers and loans

Transfers in

Transfers out

Loans out

Pre-season and friendlies

Competitions

Overview

Serie A

League table

Results summary

Results by round

Matches
The league fixtures were announced on 2 September 2020.

Coppa Italia

The draw for the tournament was held on 8 September 2020. Sassuolo entered in the round of 16.

Squad statistics

Appearances and goals

|-
! colspan=14 style=background:#DCDCDC; text-align:center| Goalkeepers

|-
! colspan=14 style=background:#DCDCDC; text-align:center| Defenders

|-
! colspan=14 style=background:#DCDCDC; text-align:center| Midfielders

|-
! colspan=14 style=background:#DCDCDC; text-align:center| Forwards

|-
! colspan=14 style=background:#DCDCDC; text-align:center| Players transferred out during the season

Goalscorers

Disciplinary record

Notes

A.  Sassuolo roster divided into two squads.

References

External links

U.S. Sassuolo Calcio seasons
Sassuolo Calcio